Rejuvenation is a medical discipline focused on the practical reversal of the aging process.

Rejuvenation may also refer to:
Rejuvenation (The Meters album), 1974
Rejuvenation (Lonnie Liston Smith album), 1985
Rejuvenation (Abstract Rude album), 2009
Rejuvenation (Juvenile album), 2012
Rejuvenation (company), an American manufacturer of light fixtures and hardware
River rejuvenation
Rejuvenation of packed red blood cells

See also

Rejuvenate!, a 1989 album by jazz saxophonist Ralph Moore